Irbe Strait, also known as Irben Strait, forms the main exit out of the Gulf of Riga to the Baltic Sea, between the Sõrve Peninsula forming the southern end of the island Saaremaa in Estonia and Courland Peninsula in Latvia. A shipping channel has been dredged along its southern shore to allow larger ships to pass.

See also Saunags.

References 

Straits of the Baltic Sea
Straits of Estonia
Straits of Latvia
Gulf of Riga
Estonia–Latvia border
International straits